The IDBI Bank Limited (IDBI Bank or IDBI) is a development finance institution under the ownership of Life Insurance Corporation of India and Government of India. It was established in 1964 as Industrial Development Bank of India, a development finance institution, which provided financial services to industrial sector. In 2005, the institution was merged with its commercial division, IDBI Bank, forming the present-day banking entity and was categorised as "other development finance institution" category. Later in March 2019, Government of India asked Life Insurance Corporation to infuse capital in the bank due to high NPA and capital adequacy issues and also asked LIC to manage the bank to meet the regulatory norms. IDBI was put under Prompt corrective action of the RBI and on 10th March 2021 IDBI came out of the PCA. At present direct and indirect shareholding of Government of India in IDBI Bank is approximately 95%, which Government of India (GoI) vide its communication F.No. 8/2/2019-BO-II dated December 17, 2019, has clarified and directed all Central/State Government departments to consider IDBI Bank for allocation of Government Business.
 Many national institutes find their roots in IDBI like SIDBI, EXIM, National Stock Exchange of India, SEBI, National Securities Depository Limited.

It has 3,683 ATMs, 1,892 branches, including one overseas branch in Dubai, 58 e-lounges and 1,407 centres . , Life Insurance Corporation holds the 49.24% shareholding and the Government of India holds 45.48%, with LIC being in control of the management of the bank.

History

Overview of development banking in India

Development Banking emerged after the Second World War and the Great Depression in the 1930s. The demand for reconstruction funds for the affected nations compelled in setting up of national institutions for reconstruction. At the time of Independence in 1947, India had a fairly developed banking system. The adoption of bank dominated financial development strategy was aimed at meeting the sectoral credit needs, particularly of agriculture and industry. Towards this end, the Reserve Bank concentrated on regulating and developing mechanisms for institution building. The commercial banking network was expanded to cater to the requirements of general banking and for meeting the short-term working capital requirements of industry and agriculture. Specialized Development Financial Institutions (DFIs) such as the IDBI, NABARD, NHB and SIDBI were set up to meet the long-term financing requirements of industry and agriculture.

Formation of Industrial Development Bank of India (IDBI)

The Industrial Development Bank of India (IDBI) was established in 1964 under an Act of Parliament as a wholly-owned subsidiary of the Reserve Bank of India. In 1976, the ownership of IDBI was transferred to the Union government and it was made the principal financial institution for coordinating the activities of institutions engaged in financing, promoting and developing industry in India. IDBI provided financial assistance, both in rupee and foreign currencies, for green-field projects and also for expansion, modernization, and diversification purposes. In the wake of financial sector reforms unveiled by the government since 1992, IDBI also provided indirect financial assistance by way of refinancing of loans extended by State-level financial institutions and banks and by way of rediscounting of bills of exchange arising out of the sale of indigenous machinery on deferred payment terms.

After the public issue of IDBI in July 1995, the government shareholding in the bank came down from 100% to 75%.

IDBI played a pioneering role, particularly in the pre-reform era (1964–91), in catalyzing broad-based industrial development in India in keeping with its Government-ordained 'development banking' charter. Some of the institutions built with the support of IDBI are the Securities and Exchange Board of India (SEBI), National Stock Exchange of India (NSE), the National Securities Depository Limited (NSDL), the Stock Holding Corporation of India Limited (SHCIL), the Credit Analysis & Research Ltd, the Exim Bank (India), the Small Industries Development Bank of India (SIDBI) and the Entrepreneurship Development Institute of India.

Conversion of IDBI into a commercial bank
A committee formed by RBI recommended the development financial institution (IDBI) to diversify its activity and harmonize the role of development financing and banking activities by getting away from the conventional distinction between commercial banking and developmental banking. To keep up with reforms in financial sector, IDBI reshaped its role from a development finance institution to a commercial institution. With the Industrial Development Bank (Transfer of Undertaking and Repeal) Act, 2003, IDBI attained the status of a limited company viz., IDBI Ltd.

Subsequently, in September 2004, the Reserve Bank of India incorporated IDBI as a 'scheduled bank' under the RBI Act, 1934. Consequently, IDBI formally entered the portals of banking business as IDBI Ltd. from 1 October 2004. The commercial banking arm, IDBI Bank, was merged into IDBI in 2005.

Direct government intervention 
The merger was expected to streamline operations of the bank. However, IDBI continued to base its policy towards industrial sector like the erstwhile IDBI entity did. This resulted in the retail business of the bank to be limited to 13 percent of its total business. This was the highest among Indian banks. The Union government intervened, with Life Insurance Corporation bailing out the bank with an infusion of  crores.

On 29 June 2018, LIC got a technical go-ahead from the Insurance Regulatory and Development Authority of India (IRDAI) to increase stake in IDBI Bank up to 51%. LIC completed the acquisition of 51% controlling stake on 21 January 2019, with a total investment of  crores.

Operations

Acquisition of United Western Bank
In 2006, IDBI Bank acquired United Western Bank (headquartered at Satara) in a rescue. By acquiring UWB, IDBI Bank doubled the number of its branches from 195 to 425.

Strategic disinvestment to LIC 
LIC of India completed the acquisition of 51% controlling stake in the bank in January 2019, making it the majority shareholder. Subsequent to the enhancement of equity stake by LIC of India, Reserve Bank of India has clarified via press release on 14 March 2019, that IDBI Bank stands re-categorised as a private sector bank, with retrospective effect from 21 January 2019. LIC took over the management control of the bank while the Union government, categorised as a promoter.

Listings and shareholding
IDBI Bank's equity shares are listed on Bombay Stock Exchange and the National Stock Exchange of India. , the Union government held 45.48% shares in IDBI Bank, while LIC held 49.24% and the remaining is held by non-promoters.

Employees
As of 31 March 2015, the bank had 16,555 employees, out of which 197 were employees with disabilities. The average age of bank employees on the same date was 34 years. The bank reported a business of ₹25.64 crores per employee and a net profit of ₹12.17 lakhs per employee during the FY 2012–13. The company incurred a loss of ₹1,538 crores towards employee benefit expenses during the same financial year. As promised by the bank's MD and CEO the employees will keep getting the same benefits and enjoy the same job security even after LIC getting the promoter status.

IDBI Intech

IDBI Intech Ltd. (IIL) is a wholly owned subsidiary of IDBI Bank, established in 2000.

It provides IT related services in the areas of Consultancy, System Integration, System implementation & support, Applications & Server hosting and other IT related managed services and specialized training.

IDBI Intech has been accredited with ISO 9001:2000 certification for IT-related services including Data Centre Management and Call Centre, and also Certified IT Security Auditing Organisation with the Indian Computer Emergency Response Team (CERT-In).

Awards and recognitions
 IDBI Bank ranked #1197 in the Forbes Global 2000 in May 2013.
 It received the 'Overall Best Bank' and 'Best Public Sector Bank' awards in the Dun & Bradstreet Banking Awards, 2011.
 In 2011, it received Banking Technology awards for best use of Business Intelligence and the best Risk Management from Indian Banks Association.

See also

 Banking in India
 Indian Financial System Code
 List of largest banks
 List of companies of India
 Make in India
 IDBI Federal Life Insurance

References

External links
 

Banks established in 1964
Banks based in Mumbai
Indian companies established in 1964
Private sector banks in India
Life Insurance Corporation
1964 establishments in Maharashtra
Companies listed on the National Stock Exchange of India
Companies listed on the Bombay Stock Exchange